The Government of National Unity, also known as the "grand coalition cabinet," was a designation for the coalition government in Kenya from April 2008 to April 2013. It was formed through negotiations between the Orange Democratic Movement's leader and presidential candidate Raila Odinga and Party of National Unity's leader and incumbent presidential candidate Mwai Kibaki in the aftermath of the 2007–2008 Kenyan crisis which had followed the controversial 2007 presidential election. 

Kibaki continued serving as the president while Odinga accepted a non-executive prime ministerial post. The cabinet constituted a record 40 ministers and 52 deputy ministers from different political parties. The deal for the creation of the cabinet was finalized on 13 April 2008, followed by the appointment of Odinga as prime minister on 14 April and the swearing-in of all members of the cabinet on 17 April.

Cabinet

References

Politics of Kenya
Coalition governments
2008 establishments in Kenya
2013 disestablishments in Kenya
Cabinets established in 2008
Cabinets disestablished in 2013